Ugo Simoni (born 3 June 1938) is an Italian former sports shooter. He competed in the 50 metre pistol event at the 1964 Summer Olympics.

References

External links
 

1938 births
Living people
Italian male sport shooters
Olympic shooters of Italy
Shooters at the 1964 Summer Olympics
People from Imola
Sportspeople from the Metropolitan City of Bologna
20th-century Italian people